Sheykh Gol (also Romanized as Sheykh Kal) is a village in Kashkan Rural District, Shahivand District, Dowreh County, Lorestan Province, Iran. At the 2006 census, its population was 129, in 27 families.

References 

Towns and villages in Dowreh County